Jorge Mondragón Vázquez (born October 30, 1962) is a Mexican retired diver. He competed in four consecutive Summer Olympics for his native country, starting in 1980. Mondragón won two bronze medals at the 1991 Pan American Games in Havana, Cuba.

References 
sports-reference

Mexican male divers
1962 births
Living people
Divers at the 1980 Summer Olympics
Divers at the 1984 Summer Olympics
Divers at the 1988 Summer Olympics
Divers at the 1992 Summer Olympics
Olympic divers of Mexico
Place of birth missing (living people)
Pan American Games bronze medalists for Mexico
Pan American Games medalists in diving
Divers at the 1991 Pan American Games
Medalists at the 1991 Pan American Games
20th-century Mexican people
21st-century Mexican people